Peltostega is an extinct genus of prehistoric trematosaurians. The type is the only known species, Peltostega erici  It is known from the Early Triassic Kongressfjellet Formation of Svalbard and Jan Mayen.

See also 
 Prehistoric amphibian
 List of prehistoric amphibians

References 

Trematosauroids
Triassic amphibians of Europe
Triassic Norway
Fossils of Norway
Fossil taxa described in 1916
Taxa named by Carl Wiman